Nowghan-e Olya (also Romanized as Nowghān-e ‘Olyā and Nowghān Olyā; also known as Narghān and Nowghān-e Bālā) is a village in Karchambu-e Shomali Rural District, in the Central District of Buin va Miandasht County, Isfahan Province, Iran. At the 2006 census, its population was 91, in 28 families.

References 

Populated places in Buin va Miandasht County